Shabeh (also Romanized as Sha‘beh or Sho‘beh; also known a sShubeh and Sūreh) is a village in Shabeh Rural District, Jangal District, Roshtkhar County, Razavi Khorasan Province, Iran. At the 2006 census, its population was 760, in 201 families.

References 

Populated places in Roshtkhar County